Shape Shift with Me is the seventh studio album by American punk rock band Against Me!, released on September 16, 2016 on Total Treble Music and Xtra Mile. The title is a lyric from the song "Norse Truth", which appears as track 10. Shape Shift with Me features a shift in vocal style on many of its songs, with Grace hailed for a more spoken word-like structure in her singing on songs such as "12:03", "333" and "Norse Truth".

No non-promotional singles have been released from the album. However, both of the B-sides recorded for the album, as identified from the band's publishing catalogue, "Stabitha Christie" and "First High of the Morning", were released on a 7" single to mark Record Store Day 2017. It is the group's only studio album recorded with bass player Inge Johansson.

Accolades

Track listing

Personnel

Against Me!
Laura Jane Grace – guitar, lead vocals, art direction
James Bowman – guitar, backing vocals
Inge Johansson – bass guitar, backing vocals
Atom Willard – drums

Additional musicians 
 Marc Hudson – bass guitar (tracks 3, 11)
 Masukaitenero – Japanese backing vocals (track 1)
 Béatrice Martin – backing vocals (uncredited) (tracks 11, 12)

Production 
 Marc Hudson – producer, mix engineer, recording engineer
 Stephen Marcussen – mastering
 Stewart Whitmore – mastering

Design
 Christopher Norris – art direction
 Steak Mtn – design, typography, and illustration

Charts

See also
 Against Me! discography

References

Against Me! albums
2016 albums
New wave albums by American artists
Post-punk albums by American artists